Prace is a municipality and village in Brno-Country District in the South Moravian Region of the Czech Republic. It has about 900 inhabitants.

Geography
It lies in the Dyje–Svratka Valley.

History
The first written mention of Prace is from 1274.

The pivotal action in the Battle of Austerlitz was fought over a nearby elevated area called Pracký kopec (Pratzen Heights).

Sights
The Cairn of Peace Memorial in Prace memorializes those killed in the Battle of Austerlitz. It was built in 1910–1912.

References

Villages in Brno-Country District